Jeong Jae-yeong (born Jeong Ji-hyeon; November 21, 1970) is a South Korean actor. He's best known for his roles in the critically acclaimed films Silmido (2003), Right Now, Wrong Then (2015), and On the Beach at Night Alone (2017). For his work in films, he won the Best Actor and Best Supporting Actor awards at the Blue Dragon Film Awards, Busan Film Critics Awards, Director's Cut Awards, Korean Association of Film Critics Awards, 9th Asia Pacific Screen Awards and Locarno International Film Festival.

Career 
Jung Jae-young started his career taking minor roles in films ranging from his debut The Adventures of Mrs. Park to Green Fish (1997), The Quiet Family (1998), and Die Bad (2000). However throughout this period he was primarily occupied with works by director/playwright Jang Jin, both on the stage and in minor roles for the films The Happenings and The Spy.

Jung's first prominent film role came in Jang Jin's third film Guns & Talks in 2001, where he played one member of the film's central quartet of assassins. The following year, he played a ruthless, cruel-minded hustler in Ryoo Seung-wan's No Blood No Tears. In 2003, his role as a death row convict turned soldier in the record-breaking Silmido marked the height of this stage of his career.

In 2004, Jung reunited with Jang in a romantic comedy Someone Special which provided him with his first lead role. For his performance in the film, he won Best Actor award at Busan Film Critics Awards. He then starred in a commercially and critically successful film Welcome to Dongmakgol. The film was based on one of Jang Jin's plays which Jung had also performed in. For his performance as a war-weary North Korean officer who befriends his counterparts from the South, Jung won Best Actor at Director's Cut Awards.

From 2005 to 2009, Jung played a string of various roles; from a shy rural farmer who travels to Uzbekistan in the hopes of finding a wife in Wedding Campaign, a betrayed gangster in Righteous Ties, a cop during a bank robbery drill gone awry in Going by the Book, a CEO under investigation in Public Enemy Returns, to a Joseon merchant who gets drawn into plans for developing a rocket against the Ming Dynasty in The Divine Weapon, and a suicidal man who finds himself washed up and stranded on an uninhabited island in Castaway on the Moon.

In 2010, Jung starred as a sinister 70-year-old village elder in the film adaptation of the popular webcomic Moss. His performance in Moss won him Buil Film Awards and Blue Dragon Film Awards for Best Actor. The following year, Jung was cast as a fading baseball star who is forced to coach a team of hearing-impaired kids in GLove, and a cold-hearted debt collector who needs a transplant in Countdown.

Jung returned in 2014 as a detective facing off against a bestselling novelist who makes a Confession of Murder, an obsessive-compulsive who falls for a carefree musician in rom-com The Plan Man, a father tracking down his daughter's killers in Broken, and an undercover assassin who tries to protect King Jeongjo in a period drama The Fatal Encounter.

In 2015, Jung was cast in his first ever television series as a welder-turned-rookie lawmaker in political drama Assembly. He next starred as a detective in science fiction thriller Duel, followed by Hong Sang-soo's film Right Now, Wrong Then. The film won the Golden Leopard, the top prize at the 68th Locarno International Film Festival, as well as Best Actor for Jung. For his performance in Right Now, Wrong Then, Jung also won Best Actor at the 35th Korean Association of Film Critics Awards, 9th Asia Pacific Screen Awards, 53rd Gijon International Film Festival, and 3rd Wildflower Film Awards. In the same year, he starred in a comedy film You Call It Passion.

Jung reunited with Hong Sang-soo in a 2017 film On the Beach at Night Alone. The film was selected to compete for the Golden Bear in the main competition section of the 67th Berlin International Film Festival. The following year, Jung played in his second television series Partners for Justice. For his performance in the series, Jung won Top Excellence Award at the 2018 MBC Drama Awards.

In 2019, Jung played Joon-gul in a comedy film The Odd Family: Zombie On Sale.

In 2021, Jung will appear in the MBC drama On the Verge of Insanity aired on MBC, alongside Moon So-ri and Lee Sang-yeob.

Filmography

Film

Television series

Awards and nominations

References

External links 

 
 
 
 Jung Jae-young Fan Cafe at Daum 

Male actors from Seoul
South Korean male film actors
South Korean male stage actors
South Korean male television actors
Seoul Institute of the Arts alumni
1970 births
Living people
Asia Pacific Screen Award winners
20th-century South Korean male actors
21st-century South Korean male actors